This is a list of tugboats that service (either currently or previously) the River Derwent and surrounds.

References

Tug boats
Transport in Tasmania
Boats
Tugboats of Australia
Maritime history of Tasmania